Nezameddin (Nezam) Mahdavi-Amiri (born August 11, 1952) is an Iranian mathematician and Distinguished Professor of Mathematics at Sharif University of Technology.
He is known for his works on Computational Optimization, Scientific Computing, Matrix Computations, Mathematical Software and Fuzzy Optimization.

References 

Living people
1952 births
21st-century Iranian mathematicians
Distinguished professors in Iran
Academic staff of Sharif University of Technology
Johns Hopkins University alumni